Hickie is the surname of the following people
Darryl Hickie (born in 1964), Canadian provincial politician
Denis Hickie (born in 1976), Irish rugby player
Gavin Hickie (born in 1980), American head coach of rugby`
Gordon Hickie (born in 1948), Scottish cinematographer
Jimmy Hickie (1915-1973), Scottish footballer
Tahlia Hickie (born in 2000), Australian rules footballer
William Hickie (1865-1950), British Army officer and politician